Reaching Out (1984) is the fourteenth studio album by the boy band Menudo, and their first in English.

It features Ricky Meléndez, Charlie Massó, Ray Reyes, Roy Rosselló, and new member Robby Rosa. Robby replaced Johnny Lozada after Johnny reached the group's age limit. The songs on this album are selections from their last four Spanish language albums translated into English, with the exception of “Like A Cannonball″. This song was recorded for the soundtrack to the Burt Reynolds film Cannonball Run II. Robby Rosa is the lead vocalist on six of the ten songs, being the only member fluent in the English language at the time.

The album sold 425,000 copies in Brazil. It peaked #108 on the Billboard 200, making it the band's first album to chart in the US.  The single "If You're Not Here" sold 270,000 in Brazil.

Track listing
"Like a Cannonball" (Como Cannonball) (Snuff Garrett, Steve Dorff, Milton Brown)  - Singer: Robby Rosa
"Indianapolis" (Alejandro Monroy, Carlos Villa)  - Singer: Robby Rosa
"Heavenly Angel" (Monroy, Villa, Mary Lynne M Pagan)  - Singer: Charlie Massó
"Because of Love" (Pagan, Villa, Julio Seijas, Eddy Guerin)  - Singer: Robby Rosa
"Motorcycle Dreamer" (Pagan, Villa, Edgardo Díaz)  - Singer: Ricky Melendez
"If You're Not Here - By My Side" (Díaz, Monroy, Pagan, Villa) [4:25] - Singer: Robby Rosa
"That's What You Do" (Monroy, Pagan, Villa)  - Singer: Ray Reyes
"Gimme Rock" (Monroy, Pagan, Seijas, Villa)  - Singer: Robby Rosa
"Gotta Get On Moving" (Monroy, Pagan, Villa)  - Singer: Ricky Meléndez
"Fly Away" (Díaz, Monroy, Pagan, Villa)  - Singer: Robby Rosa

Production
Arranged and conducted by Alejandro Monroy and Carlos Villa
Produced by Edgardo Díaz, with additional production by Mary Lynne M. Pagan
Engineered by Jaime Camacho (vocals) and Jose Vinader (music)
Mixed by Carlos Martos

Charts

References

1984 albums
Menudo (band) albums
RCA Records albums